Marketing assessments are payments in United States agricultural policy. At times, producers and first purchasers of some supported commodities are required to pay assessments as a contribution toward achieving budget deficit reduction targets. Under the 1996 farm bill (P.L. 104-127), assessments were imposed on sugar processors and on producers and first buyers of peanuts. However, the 1996 farm bill (P.L. 104-127) eliminated a milk marketing assessment.  The 2002 farm bill (P.L. 107-171) eliminated the assessments for peanuts and sugar.  Tobacco was subject to a no-net-cost assessment on all marketings to offset Commodity Credit Corporation (CCC) losses on price support loan operations until support was ended in 2005 under the quota buyout provision (P.L. 108-357, Title VI).

References 

United States Department of Agriculture